Ormeau may refer to:

 Ormeau, Queensland, a town on the Gold Coast hinterland in Queensland, Australia
 Belfast Ormeau (UK Parliament constituency), 1918–1922
 Ormeau Road, a major road in Belfast, and the area around it
 "Ormeau", a song by Beaumont Hannant